Rosenella Winifred Cruciani "Rose" Totino (January 16, 1915 – June 21, 1994) was an American entrepreneur and pizzeria owner whose frozen pizza business co-founded with her husband became the foundation for the Totino's brand. After selling the company to Pillsbury, Totino became their first female corporate vice president.

Biography

Rose dropped out of school at age 16 to support her family by cleaning houses. In 1934 she married James R. Totino (1911 – 1981) and remained married until his death of heart attack while vacationing in Las Vegas, Nevada.

They opened their own pizzeria in Minneapolis in 1951 and later expanded from take-out only to Totino's Kitchen with table service. In 1962, they started Totino's Finer Foods in St. Louis Park, Minnesota and began mass production of frozen pizzas. They built a new plant in Fridley, Minnesota in 1971. Demand continued to grow, and they sold their company to Pillsbury in 1975 for about $22 million in Pillsbury stock.

Totino's grandson Steve Elwell bought the restaurant in 1987 and moved Totino's Kitchen from its original location in August 2007 to a new location in Mounds View, Minnesota. The new location closed in 2011, ending a 60-year run.

The Totinos were involved in Minnesota charities. Totino-Grace High School in Fridley was renamed in their honor in 1980. They helped finance the Totino Fine Arts Center at University of Northwestern - St. Paul in Roseville, Minnesota and the NET Ministries headquarters in St. Paul, Minnesota. Totino died of cancer at Methodist Hospital in St. Louis Park, Minnesota. She was inducted into the Minnesota Inventors Hall of Fame in 2008.

References

External links
 via Minnesota Inventors Hall of Fame
Bonnie Totino Brenny: My Mother's Legacy via Minnesota Historical Society
Totino's Italian Kitchen history

1915 births
1994 deaths
20th-century American businesspeople
American food company founders